Falanja (فلنجه) is a red seed (perhaps the seed of cubeb) used in the making of perfumes.  It was used to make perfumes by women in the court of Jahangir.

References
 

Seeds
Perfumery